Nakayama Shōzen (中山 正善, April 23, 1905 – November 14, 1967) was the second Shinbashira of Tenrikyo. He was the first son of Nakayama Shinnosuke, the first Shinbashira, and the great-grandson of Nakayama Miki, the foundress of Tenrikyo.

Biography
Nakayama Shōzen was born on April 23, 1905 in what is now Tenri, Nara, Japan. He was born to parents Nakayama Shinnosuke and Tamae.

On January 21, 1915, at the age of ten, Shōzen was installed as the Shinbashira. However, due to Nakayama's young age, the duties of the office were conducted by Yamazawa Tamenobu. In 1923, Shōzen entered Osaka High School. In 1925, he founded the Tenri Foreign Language School, the predecessor to Tenri University, and installed as its principal. Later in the same year, he assumed all of the responsibilities of the Shinbashira office.

In 1926, Shōzen graduated from Osaka High School and entered the religious studies department at University of Tokyo. The department chair at the time was Prof. Anesaki Masaharu, who today is considered the father of religious studies in Japan. Shōzen's graduation thesis, titled "On Missionary Work" (伝道について Dendō ni tsuite), was an analysis of questionnaire results that were solicited from Tenrikyo church head ministers and missionaries regarding the state of Tenrikyo's missionary activities at the time. His thesis was later edited and published by Tenrikyo Doyusha as Tenrikyō dendōsha ni kansuru chōsa in 1930. He graduated from University of Tokyo in 1929.

Selected writings
『神』『月日』及び『をや』について [Concerning "Kami," "Tsukihi," and "Oya"] (1935)
おふでさきに現れた親心 [Parental Heart Revealed in the Ofudesaki] (1955)

References

Further reading
 

Tenrikyo
1905 births
1967 deaths
University and college founders